Vishnugupta may refer to:

 Vishnugupta (Gupta Empire), king of the Gupta Empire 540–550 CE
 Chanakya (375–283 BCE), traditionally identified as Vishnugupta, ancient Indian polymath and royal advisor

See also
 Vishnu Gupta, founder in 2011 and leader of Hindu Sena, an Indian right-wing organization